Neoleucinodes is a genus of snout moths of the subfamily Spilomelinae in the family Crambidae. The genus was described by Hahn William Capps in 1948 as a Neotropical split-off of the Old World genus Leucinodes.

Species
Neoleucinodes alegralis (Schaus, 1920)
Neoleucinodes dissolvens (Dyar, 1914)
Neoleucinodes elegantalis (Guenée, 1854)
Neoleucinodes galapagensis Landry, 2016
Neoleucinodes imperialis (Guenée, 1854)
Neoleucinodes incultalis (Schaus, 1912)
Neoleucinodes prophetica (Dyar, 1914)
Neoleucinodes silvaniae Diaz & Solis, 2007
Neoleucinodes torvis Capps, 1948

References

Spilomelinae
Crambidae genera
Taxa named by Hahn William Capps